Joseph George Bannon (May 1, 1874 – January 19, 1937) was an American college football coach. He served as the head football coach at Maryland Agricultural College—now known as the University of Maryland, College Park—in 1894, compiling a record of 4–3.

Biography
Bannon was born in Maryland on May 1, 1874. His great-grandfather was an officer in the rebellious Irish army during the Rebellion of 1798. His father, Michael Bannon, was born in County Tyrone, Ireland in 1827 and emigrated to the United States, where he arrived in Baltimore in 1847 with only ten cents. He worked as a teacher and eventually received an education in law and established a real estate business. Michael Bannon entered politics in Anne Arundel County and served as a Maryland State Senator. His brother, James P. Bannon, was a prominent Anne Arundel County politician and lawyer.

Bannon attended the Maryland Agricultural College (now the University of Maryland), where he played on the football team as an end from 1892 to 1894. Bannon served as the head coach during the 1894 season and amassed a 4–3 record. He graduated from Maryland with a Bachelor of Science degree in 1895. Bannon died in Jessup, Maryland on January 19, 1937.

Head coaching record

References

1874 births
1937 deaths
19th-century players of American football
American football ends
Player-coaches
Maryland Terrapins football coaches
Maryland Terrapins football players
Sportspeople from Baltimore
Coaches of American football from Maryland
Players of American football from Baltimore
American people of Irish descent